The Three Mile River or Threemile River is a river in Bristol County, Massachusetts. It is formed by the junction of the Rumford and Wading rivers in the town of Norton. It flows in a southeasterly direction for  through the towns of Norton, Taunton and Dighton, where it joins the Taunton River.

On August 25, 2008, the Three Mile Watershed was designated an Area of Critical Environmental Concern (ACEC) by the Massachusetts Department of Conservation and Recreation (DCR). The ACEC designation imparts certain protections and restrictions within a designated area relating to new development and other human activities.

See also
List of Massachusetts rivers
Taunton River

References

External links
Taunton River Stewardship Program: The Wildlands Trust of Southeastern Massachusetts
Taunton River Watershed Alliance
University of Rhode Island: Taunton River Watershed critical resource atlas
TauntonRiver.org Wild & Scenic River page

Greater Taunton Area
Rivers of Bristol County, Massachusetts
Taunton River watershed
Taunton, Massachusetts
Rivers of Massachusetts

fr:Comté de Bristol (Massachusetts)